The Lake Mountains (also known as simply Lake Mountain) are a  mountain range located on the western edge of the Utah Valley in northwestern Utah County, Utah, United States. The range forms the northwest border of Utah Lake, and its proximity to major population centers allows its use for communication towers, mostly in its north section, bordering Eagle Mountain.

Description

The range is arc-shaped, curved to the east.

The range is bordered by Cedar Valley on the west; the Oquirrh Mountains on the northwest|; the Traverse Mountains on the north, Utah Lake and Utah Valley on the northeast, east and southeast; the Goshen Valley on the south-southwest, and the East Tintic Mountains on the southwest. Utah State Route 68 (also known as Redwood Road in Saratoga Springs) runs along the northeast, east, and southeast perimeter of the mountains (along the shore of Utah Lake) and Utah State Route 73 passes by the northern edge. Lake Mountain Communications Road (a dirt road) runs roughly north-south through the range (between Saratoga Springs and Eagle Mountain) and provides access to the multiple radio communication towers on the range. Several minor dirt roads also cross the southern end of the range, with Soldiers Pass Road being the most prominent.

There are seventeen named canyons on the east side of the range, running toward Utah Lake: Long, Pfieffer, Burnt (southern), Chaparral, Miners, Potter, Enoch, Seep, Little, Olaf, Limekiln, Losee, Clark, Israel, Lott, Burnt (northern), and Reformation canyons (from south to north), with Limekiln Canyon being in the approximate center. The west side has much fewer named canyons, running toward Cedar Valley: Mercer, Ivans, Wildcat, and Wiley (from south to north), with Wiley Canyon being in the approximate center.

Radio infrastructure
Radio infrastructure on the range serves several radio and television needs for the cities of Provo, Orem, American Fork, and almost all of Utah county.

FM & HD Radio stations
The Lake Mountains house radio towers for several radio stations serving the Provo area. KENZ 94.9 FM, a contemporary hits station, broadcasts from the range . KJMY, a Salt Lake City-based hot adult contemporary format radio station on 99.5 FM formerly had a translator known as K256AE, which is on 99.1 MHz from a tower on the mountains. The translator is now used as a rebroadcast of KJMY's HD-2 stream through a loophole in FCC rules. It is known as "Country 99.1." KVFX had a translator known as K284AI-FM. K284AI was on located 104.7 MHz. In order to make way for KNIV’s move into the Salt Lake City market, the station signed off the air.
One religious radio translator also call the mountain home. K217CL (91.3 FM), carries programming from KYCC, and is licensed to Provo. KUDD 103.9 FM has a booster on the mountain, providing coverage to the Provo-Orem metropolitan area.

Amateur (ham) radio
Multiple repeaters for amateur radio exist on the Lake Mountains. The most well known repeaters are operated by the Utah Amateur Radio Club (UARC), first coordinated in 1927, and the Utah Valley Amateur Radio Club (UVARC), first coordinated in 2016  Numerous other stations share tower space with the repeaters above, all operating on different frequencies.

Television stations

Numerous high and low power television stations call the Lake Mountains their home. KUPX's, former analog broadcast on channel 16 from a tower on the mountains. KUPX is owned by Paxson Salt Lake City License Inc and carries programming from Ion Television. Its tower was located on the northern flank of the mountain (pictured right). KUPX now broadcasts its digital television signal on channel 29 from Farnsworth Peak. K22IT, another television station on the mountains, carried programming from KTMW in Salt Lake City. It remained in analog, and had no application to transmit in digital. Its license has since been deleted. 
KUTH, Salt Lake City's Univision affiliate, broadcasts its digital broadcast from the Lake Mountains on channel 32. K43JV, a lower power television translator, carries programming from 3ABN. It broadcasts on channel 43. Currently it has a construction permit to transmit in digital on RF channel 16, the former analog home of KUPX. K49GD, channel 49, was a translator for KTMW and carried a variety of programming. K49GD was licensed to Spanish Fork. The station license was deleted by the FCC.
KUTH filed an application with the FCC to move its transmitter to Farnsworth Peak which would leave only K43JV transmitting from the mountain. This move will allow KUTH to better serve the Wasatch Front because of Farnsworth Peak's higher terrain and close proximity to Salt Lake City.

Internet service providers
The Lake Mountain provide an advantageous location for internet service providers to either provide wireless internet to local residents, or to relay data between facilities. Providers include Rise Broadband, InnovativeAir, SenaWave, and Avative Fiber.

See also

 List of mountain ranges of Utah
 List of mountains in Utah

References

External links

 Wiley Canyon (west of range center, coordinates), topoquest
 
 Lake Mountain, Utah @ RTLI

Mountain ranges of Utah County, Utah
Mountain ranges of the Great Basin
Mountain ranges of Utah